Carlos Alberto Ortega Ferrada (born 25 March 1973) was a Chilean footballer who played as goalkeeper.

Club career
On 30 December 2003, he joined Cobreloa. On 13 June 2006, was reported that Universidad de Chile would have him in their plans, which is why they proposed their Bolivian goalkeeper, José Carlo Fernández, as their replacement in Cobreloa.

In 2007, he left the club after three years and signed for Deportes Antofagasta.

Honours

Club
Cobreloa
 Primera División de Chile (1): 2004 Clausura

References

External links
 

1973 births
Chilean people
Living people
People from Tomé
Chilean footballers
Association football goalkeepers
Club Deportivo Palestino footballers
Chilean Primera División players